Silakhor Plain is the largest flat land in Lorestan province of Iran. Located in the northeast of Lorestan, Silakhor covers most of the populated parts of Borujerd, Dorud and Azna counties.

Geography
Silakhor is a grassland plain expanded northwest to south east along with the elevated reliefs of Zagros mountains. Starting 15 km north of the city of Borujerd in Oshtorinan District, this large geographical feature ends in south of Azna county. Silakhor is divided into two sections: Upper Silakhor and Lower Silakhor. Upper Silakhor is a smaller area located between Oshtorinan town and Borujerd city. Lower Silakhor starts from Borujerd city and after passing the town of Dorud, it ends in south of Azna town where Oshtorankuh is located.
Silakhor is an upper section of Karun River's basin. Starting from Garrin Mountain, Gelerood River passes southern footnotes of the city of Borujerd and receives more creeks in Lower Silakhor where it is called Tireh River. After joining Zaz river in Dorud, it continues toward the southern province of Khuzestan. Sezar river and then Dez River are other names for this river.

Geology
Geology of Silakhor is important as this plain is a border of Zagros and Central Iran tectonic plates. The west wing of Silakhor is the first row of Zagros known as Elevated Zagros which contains the highest picks of Zagros. From northwest to southeast, Silakhor plain is neighboring Garrin Mountain, Mount Sekuzan, Mount Mishparvar, Mount Shahneshin and Oshtorankuh. Heading east, Silakhor Plain reaches Inner Highlands of the Zagros Mountains also known as Sanandej - Sirjan Zone.

Earthquakes
Being the marginal junction of Elevated Zagros and the Inner Highlands, Silakhor is an active earthquake zone. The Trans-Zagros Fault has caused several heavy earthquakes there. Between 6,000–8,000 fatalities were caused by the 7.3  Borujerd earthquake that occurred south of Borujerd on January 23, 1909. Later, the 6.1  Borujerd earthquake occurred on March 31, 2006.

References

Plains of Iran
Landforms of Lorestan Province